Adriana Espinosa De Los Monteros (born 18 July 1991) is an Ecuadorian archer. She competed in the women's individual event at the 2020 Summer Olympics.

References

External links
 

1991 births
Living people
Ecuadorian female archers
Olympic archers of Ecuador
Archers at the 2020 Summer Olympics
Sportspeople from Guayaquil
21st-century Ecuadorian women
20th-century Ecuadorian women